Laurence Reavell-Carter CBE (27 August 1914 – 4 October 1985) was an English discus thrower. He was born in Brentford. He competed at the 1936 Summer Olympics in Berlin, and at the 1948 Summer Olympics in London.

Reavell-Carter was a Wing Commander of the Royal Air Force, and was decorated Commander of the Order of the British Empire.

References

External links

1914 births
1985 deaths
People from Brentford
British male discus throwers
Athletes (track and field) at the 1936 Summer Olympics
Athletes (track and field) at the 1948 Summer Olympics
Olympic athletes of Great Britain
Commanders of the Order of the British Empire